Live at The Lighthouse is a live album by American jazz guitarist Grant Green featuring a performance recorded at the Lighthouse Café in Hermosa Beach, California in 1972 and released on the Blue Note label.

Reception

The Allmusic review by Steve Huey awarded the album 4 stars and stated "Some of Grant Green's hottest moments as a jazz-funk bandleader came on his live records of the era, which were filled with extended, smoking grooves and gritty ensemble interplay. Live at the Lighthouse makes a fine companion piece to the excellent Alive!, though there are some subtle differences which give the album its own distinct flavor".

Track listing
 Introduction by Hank Stewart - 2:30  
 "Windjammer" (Neal Creque) - 12:15  
 "Betcha by Golly, Wow" (Thom Bell, Linda Creed) - 7:41  
 "Fancy Free" (Donald Byrd) - 14:44  
 "Flood in Franklin Park" (Shelton Laster) - 15:00  
 "Jan Jan" (Mose Davis) - 12:18  
 "Walk in the Night" (Johnny Bristol, Marilyn McLeod) - 6:37  
Recorded at the Lighthouse Café in Hermosa Beach, California on April 21, 1972

Personnel
Grant Green - guitar 
Claude Bartee - soprano saxophone, tenor saxophone 
Gary Coleman - vibes
Shelton Laster - organ
Wilton Felder - electric bass
Greg Williams - drums
Bobbye Porter Hall - percussion
Hank Stewart - announcer

References 

Blue Note Records live albums
Grant Green albums
1972 live albums
Albums recorded at the Lighthouse Café